A Night at the Roosevelt with Guy Lombardo—and His Royal Canadians is a long-playing record album (LP) issued by Decca Records in the United States in 1954.

Track listing
Side 1
Sweet Sue, Just You
Whistling in the Dark,
The Petite Waltz, 
Lombardo Medley #1,
Managua-Nicaragua,
From This Moment On,

Side 2
Did You Ever See a Dream Walking?,
I Want a Girl (Just Like the Girl That Married Dear Old Dad),
Japansy,
Lombardo Medley #2,
No Can Do,
The Most Beautiful Girl in the World

References

1954 albums
Decca Records albums
Guy Lombardo albums